"Everybody's Trying to Be My Baby" is a rockabilly song often credited to Carl Perkins. Based on a 1936 song written by singer/songwriter Rex Griffin, it achieved widespread popularity when it was released in 1957 by Perkins and covered by the Beatles in 1964.

Composition and Controversy
"Everybody's Tryin' to Be My Baby" was written and recorded in 1936 by Decca artist Rex Griffin. On March 2, 1936 at the Roosevelt Hotel in New Orleans, Louisiana, it was among ten self-penned tracks recorded that day by the recently-signed artist, accompanied only by his guitar. It was released on Decca 5294 in November 1936  to little notice. Although the song was never published, it was covered by Johnny Barfield and Roy Newman in 1939, and Griffin copyrighted it on January 22, 1944.

In March 1956, Carl  Lee  Perkins, who had released "Blue Suede Shoes" the previous December, was working on follow up material at Sun Studios in Memphis, Tennessee, and brought in a song called "Everybody's Trying to Be My Baby", that he had written. Shortly after it was recorded, Perkins and his brother were in a serious auto accident, and the song and album were not released until May 1957. Perkins was listed as the sole writer when Knox Music, Inc. published it on November 12, 1957. It is unknown, but doubtful, that Griffin ever confronted Perkins, or even learned of the matter, since he died two years later, while the 1950s non-album oriented radio environment prevailed. In retrospect, Perkins contributed a modern arrangement, along with some minor lyric changes.

The recording was later re-released on the 1961 Sun Records album, 'Teen Beat: The Best of Carl Perkins', 'Carl Perkins' Original Golden Hits' (Sun International, 1969), 'Original Sun Greatest Hits' by Rhino Records in 1986, and further compilations.

The Beatles' version

The Beatles recorded "Everybody's Trying to Be My Baby" on October 18, 1964, at EMI Studios, London, with George Harrison (a lifelong fan of Perkins) on vocals. Harrison's vocals were heavily processed with the STEED effect. It was first released as the final track on Beatles for Sale in the United Kingdom later that year, and likewise as the concluding track on the North American album Beatles '65.

The Beatles' recording finishes with a false ending, with the final phrase repeating itself after the song seems to have stopped. A version recorded live at the Star-Club in Hamburg in December 1962 contained four of these musical phrases.

Live performances of the Beatles' "Everybody's Trying to Be My Baby" were recorded in June 1963 for the BBC radio program Pop Go The Beatles, and in November 1964 for Saturday Club. The latter recording can be heard on Live at the BBC.

The Beatles continued to perform the song after their studio recording was released. It was included in the on stage set list in their 1965 European tour of France, Italy and Spain and their ten city August tour of the United States. The performance from the Paris concert was videotaped and broadcast on French television later that year. Audio from the performance recorded at New York's Shea Stadium on August 15, 1965, edited from the 1966 documentary film, was later included in Anthology 2.

In 1976, Capitol released the song on the compilation album Rock 'n' Roll Music.

George Harrison performed the song with Carl Perkins on the Cinemax cable special Blue Suede Shoes: A Rockabilly Session in 1985. Bruce Springsteen performed the song live in concert in 1998 as a tribute to Carl Perkins on news of his death. Johnny Cash’s mid-90s version of the song  backed by Carl Perkins and Tom Petty and the Heartbreakers was included on his 2003 concept-compilation album Unearthed'.

In 2016, the song was featured as a bonus track on the remastered Live at the Hollywood Bowl album in a live performance from August 30, 1965 in conjunction with the release of the Ron Howard concert film The Beatles: Eight Days a Week''.

Personnel
George Harrison – double-tracked lead vocals, lead guitar
John Lennon – acoustic rhythm guitar, tambourine
Paul McCartney – bass guitar
Ringo Starr – drums

References

Carl Perkins songs
The Beatles songs
Music published by MPL Music Publishing
Song recordings produced by George Martin
1936 songs
1957 songs
Songs written by Carl Perkins